The following is a list in chronological order of monuments to Arthur Wellesley, 1st Duke of Wellington (1769–1852), a leading British political and military figure of the 19th century, particularly noted for his defeat of Napoleon in the Battle of Waterloo in 1815:

List of monuments
 A monumental column and statue in his birthplace in Trim, County Meath, Ireland (1817)
 Wellington Monument, London, on Park Lane, London; a colossal bronze statue of Achilles by Richard Westmacott (1822)
 Wellington Arch on Hyde Park Corner, London, built to a design by Decimus Burton (1825–1827)
 Equestrian statue of the Duke of Wellington, City of London, by Francis Leggatt Chantrey (1844) This equestrian statue has "Erected June 16, 1844" inscribed into its plinth.
 Wellington Monument, Old Woodhall Road,  Woodhall Spa, Lincolnshire, a column with bust on top (1844)
 Equestrian statue of the Duke of Wellington, Glasgow, by Carlo Marochetti (1844). The Royal Exchange Square, Queen Street, in Glasgow, Scotland, has a statue of Wellington astride a horse, outside the Gallery of Modern Art. The statue does feature the bicorne cocked hat associated with him, but it is in his hand, not on his head. The statue is often "defaced" by the placing of a traffic cone on Wellington's head.

 Equestrian statue of the Duke of Wellington, Aldershot, originally at Hyde Park Corner, by Matthew Cotes Wyatt (1846). In 1838 a proposal to build a statue of Wellington resulted in the building of a giant statue of him on his horse Copenhagen, placed above the Wellington Arch at Constitution Hill in London directly outside Apsley House, his former London home.
 A statue of Wellington by the sculptor Thomas Milnes at Woolwich Arsenal, which now stands in Wellington Park (1848)

 Equestrian statue of the Duke of Wellington, East End of Princes Street, Edinburgh, by Sir John Steell (1848–52)
 Wellington Monument, Somerset, in the Blackdown Hills (commenced 1817, completed in 1854). This monument overlooks the town of Wellington, Somerset, from which Wellington's title was taken.
 A statue of Wellington by the sculptor Carlo Marochetti in Leeds, England, which now stands in Woodhouse Moor park (1855). His boots have been painted red, presumably by local students.
 A statue in Piccadilly Gardens, Manchester, by Matthew Noble (1855/6)
 A monument in the Great Hall of the Guildhall, London, by John Bell (1856)
 Duke of Wellington Statue, The Bulwark, Brecon, Wales, by John Evan Thomas (1858)

 Wellington Monument, Dublin, by Robert Smirke (commenced 1817, completed 1861). This memorial in Phoenix Park is the tallest stone obelisk in Europe
 Duke of Wellington Commemorative Column, outside Stratfield Saye House, the Duke's Hampshire residence, a column with statue on top, by Carlo Marochetti (1863)
 Wellington's Column in Liverpool by Mr George and Andrew Lawson (1865)
 Wellington Monument, Baslow, Derbyshire. A stone cross (1866)
 Equestrian statue of the Duke of Wellington, Hyde Park Corner, London, by Joseph Boehm (1888)
 A monument in St Paul's Cathedral, London, where he is buried. By Alfred Stevens (completed 1912)
 A bust in Porto where he led Anglo-Portuguese troops against French troops in the 1809 in the Second Battle of Porto, Portugal.

The Duke's horse, Copenhagen, has a monument over his grave at Stratfield Saye House, Hampshire.

See also 
 Arms, titles, honours and styles of Arthur Wellesley, 1st Duke of Wellington
 Wellington (disambiguation)
 Waterloo Memorial (disambiguation)

References

Wellington
List